Piping Shepherds is an oil on canvas painting by Dutch artist Aelbert Cuyp, created in 1643-1644. The painting depicts a pair of shepherds playing a tune on their pipes as their flock idles nearby. The work is in the collection of the Metropolitan Museum of Art, in New York.

References

1643 paintings
1644 paintings
Paintings in the collection of the Metropolitan Museum of Art
Paintings by Aelbert Cuyp